Pedro Martinez is a Mexican-American school administrator serving as the CEO of Chicago Public Schools (the superintendent position of Chicago Public Schools). He formerly served as superintendent of the San Antonio Independent School District and superintendent of the Washoe County School District

Early life and education
Martinez was born in Mexico. he immigrated to the United States at the age of six. He was the eldest of twelve children. He grew up in Chicago. Martinez attended high school at Chicago's Benito Juarez Community Academy.

He received a bachelor's degree in accounting from the University of Illinois at Urbana-Champaign, and an Masters in Business Administration from DePaul University.

Martinez later received a fellowship from the Public Education Leadership Project at Harvard University, and graduated from the Broad Superintendents Academy.

Early career
After his graduation from the University of Illinois, he first worked as an auditor, including for Catholic Charities.

In 2003, he began to work as the budget director for Chicago Public Schools, serving under Arne Duncan, then the district's CEO. In 2008, he  was made chief financial officer, and in 2009 he was made regional superintendent for the West Side of Chicago. Two months after being made regional superintendent, he left to work in Nevada.

Martinez worked as a deputy superintendent for the Washoe County School District. He was credited with helping to increase high school graduation rates there.

In April 2011, Martinez was hired as the deputy superintendent of instruction by the Clark County School District, succeeding the retiring Linda Kohut-Rost.

Superintendent of Washoe County School District
In June 2012, Martinez was hired as the of Washoe County School District, succeeding the departing Heath Morrison. Washoe County is the second-largest school district in Nevada. He was fired on July 22, 2014 after being accused of deceiving the district about his credentials as a certified public accountant, as he was not a licensed one. His firing had been done by the school board in violation of open meeting laws, and wound up costing the taxpayers a half-million dollars in legal settlement fees to Martinez. He was reinstated after his firing had been found to have been illegal. Martinez formally left the post of superintendent in November 2014, and was succeeded by interim superintendent Traci Davis.

Superintendent of San Antonio Independent School District
Martinez became the superintendent of the San Antonio Independent School District in June 2015.

Martinez utilized census data to help calculate the extend of "need" at each of the district's schools.

During his tenure, the district became the fastest-improving district in the state of Texas, and drew national attention to Martinez and his work. Its state ratings went from an "F" to a "B" during his tenure.

He placed low-rated schools into the hands of private organizations, such as charter school operators, in order to improve their performances. Such a practice has received criticism from many public education advocates. He would later state that Texas laws placed him in a situation where he had few options but to privatize and hand schools over to charter operators, arguing that the alternative would have been being forced to close those schools. Upon his departure from the district, Alejandra Lopez, the president of the teachers union San Antonio Alliance of Teachers and Support Personnel, claimed she felt Martinez had failed to hear or respect stakeholders' opinions when making decisions regarding these schools, claiming, “Pedro Martinez’s tenure here was characterized by a pro-charter agenda that is a hallmark of the Broad Academy that he attended, and very top-down decision-making.”

During the COVID-19 pandemic, Martinez was credited with pioneering ways for large city school districts to keep their schools open, while keeping students and faculty safe. He partnered with a local nonprofit, Community Labs, to provide free COVID-19 testing at all school campuses, coordinated with vaccine clinics. Texas governor Greg Abbott issued a ban on mask mandates and vaccine mandates. However, Martinez had the school district adopt a mask mandate. He also issued a vaccine mandate requiring for all staff to be vaccinated, which Texas Attorney General Ken Paxton sued the district over.

He left the job to accept his new role as head of schools in Chicago. The San Antonio Independent School District trustees accepted his resignation on September 20, 2021, voting to release Martinez from his contract with the district effective September 28. They also voted to appoint Robert Jaklich to serve as his interim successor beginning the following day. Before his departure, president of the school board Christina Martinez credited him with helping to improve its state academic rating, increasing its graduation rates, and expanding dual language programs. Others who praised him included former San Antonio mayor Henry Cisneros and the San Antonio Express-News editorial board.

CEO of Chicago Public Schools
On September 15, 2021, Chicago mayor Lori Lightfoot announced that Martinez would be appointed as the CEO (superintendent) of Chicago Public Schools. Martinez declared that he would plan to take office in the final week of September. On September 22, the Chicago Board of Education unanimously voted to approve his appointment as CEO, to take office on September 29. As scheduled, Martinez took office on September 29, 2021. He is the first hispanic individual to serve as CEO of the district on a permanent basis. The district is the third-largest school district in the United States.

Personal life
Martinez is married to Benice Alejo. He has two children.

References

CEOs of Chicago Public Schools
Educators from Illinois
21st-century Mexican educators
Educators from Nevada
Educators from Texas
21st-century American educators
Living people
Year of birth missing (living people)
DePaul University alumni
University of Illinois Urbana-Champaign alumni